Tiziano Fratus (born 1975 in Bergamo) is an Italian poet and publisher.

Work
He wrote the poetic and dramatic cycle The Molossus (2000–2005) comprising the monologue in verse autumn for eleni, the collection of poems lumina, the long dramatic poem the inquisition, the prison poem the cry, the collection shipwreck at times of colonies. Autumn for eleni (2002) was staged in Turin Velan Center and Arezzo Wave. The Molossus is published in 2007 as a long modern poem divided into 52 bocche or mouthes. Fratus directed the videopoems into the man (2004) presented in Genoa International Poetry Festival, in Rome Contemporary Art Museum (Macro), catalogued in the Scottish Poetry Library in Edinburgh and in Poets House in New York, and the slogger (2005) presented in Parco Poesia in Riccione and Ars Poetica in Bratislava.

He won the XII Poetry Biennal in Alessandria. He worked with the theatre company OzooNo for the show V, part of the 2005/2006 season at Turin’s Teatro Stabile. A inquisiçao was translated into Portuguese and presented at Casa Fernando Pessoa, Lisbon; in French and presented in Paris. His poetry was translated, published and/or performed in English, French, Portuguese, Slovak, Polish, German, Spanish and Japanese. He edited essays on contemporary Italian theatre and drama, conversations. He freelanced for Outis – National Centre for Contemporary Drama in Milan and made lecture tours throughout Europe. He lived in different cities as Turin, Venice and Milan directing the observatory ManifatturAE; he directs the contemporary season Dissection in Teatro Fondamenta Nuove (Venice) and the Festival Torino Poesia (Turin).

In 2006, he published the short poetry collection torsion presented at Turin Gay Pride 2006 and the long collection i kiss your scars. In March 2008 he published a new collection of poems, Flesh Gospel that he presented all around Italy (Turin, Milan, Genoa, Venice, Rome, XXI Turin International Bookfier) and in Europe; his poems will be published on French magazines Les Citadelles in Paris, Frau und Hunt in Germany, DiVersos in Portugal, on polish literature review Studium, ion the Literary Review Singapore, in Hong Kong' mag Softblow. In 2007, he founds the independent poetry press Edizioni Torino Poesia.

In autumn 2008, Swiss publisher Edizioni Le Ricerche published the bilingual anthology Italian/French Poésies murmurées sur la berge du Pô. Six poètes de Turin Poésie, presented in Paris (in collaboration with the review Borborygmes), in Montepellier (Salon du Livre 2009) and in Marseille (Italian Institute of Culture); the independent American publisher Farfalla Press published Fratus's poem A Room in Jerusalem touring the US in New York (Bowery Poetry Club), Burlington (University of Vermont) and Chicago (TH!NK art gallery, in collaboration with The Poetry Center), the bilingual anthologies Italian/English Double Skin (Ethos Books, Singapore, edited with Alvin Pang) and 5PX2 (Edinburgh, present in April 2009 at the Italian Cultural Institute, in collaboration with The Scottish Poetry Library).

In 2010 a selection of his poetry was translated into English by Francesco Lavato, executive director of the Poetry Center in Chicago, and published in the volume Creaturing presented in New York (Columbia University, Bowery Poetry Club), Minneapolis (Open Book), St Paul (Macalester College), Chicago (University of Illinois, Istituto Italiano di Cultura), Grosse Pointe / Detroit (Ewald Library), San Diego (San Diego State University) and Santa Crux (Felik Kulpa Art Gallery).

Bibliography

Poetry

a inquisiçao long poem (2004)

Double Skin. New Poetry Voices from Italy and Singapore bilingual anthology (2009)

5PX2. Five Italian Poets and Five Scottish Poets bilingual anthology (2009)

Viaggio in Italia. Ocho poetas italianos contemporaneos bilingual anthology (2009)

Creaturing. Selected Poems bilingual volume (2010)

Theatre and Drama

Lo spazio aperto conversations (2002) 

L'architettura dei fari essay (2003) 

Os teatros que vem de Italia anthology (2004) 

Salmagundi by Marco Martinelli play (2004) 

Studi per esseri umani. Il teatro di Peter Asmussen plays anthology (2005)

Teatro di Stefano Angelucci Marino plays anthology (2006)

References

1975 births
Living people
Businesspeople from Bergamo
Italian poets
Italian male poets
Writers from Bergamo